Camogie in County Cork is administered by the Cork County Board of the Camogie Association.

History
Several people from County Cork, including Síle Horgan, Lil Kirby, Mary Moran, Mary O'Callaghan, Joan O'Flynn and Lil O'Grady, have served as presidents of the national Camogie Association.

The Cork county camogie team have won the All-Ireland Senior Camogie Championship on 28 occasions. These include wins in 1934, 1935, 1936, 1939, 1940, 1941, 1970, 1971, 1972, 1973, 1978, 1980, 1982, 1983, 1992, 1993, 1995, 1997, 1998, 2002, 2005, 2006, 2008, 2009, 2014, 2015, 2017 and 2018.

Cork have also won the National Camogie League on 16 occasions. These include the 1984,  1986,  1991, 1992,  1995, 1996, 1997, 1998, 1999, 2000, 2001,  2003,  2007,  2008,  2012 and 2013 league competitions.

Notable Cork players have included team of the century members Marie Costine, Sandie Fitzgibbon, Linda Mellerick and Pat Moloney, player of the year recipients Briege Corkery, Claire Cronin, Marion McCarthy, Teresa Murphy, Aoife Murray, Mary O'Leary, Fiona O'Driscoll, Gemma O'Connor, Mary O'Connor and Deirdre Sutton, All Star award winners Rena Buckley, Síle Burns, Orla Cotter, Emer Dillon, Lynn and Stephanie Dunlea, Cathriona Foley, Anna Geary, Rachel Moloney and Jennifer O'Leary, and Elaine Burke, Ann Comerford, Kathleen Cotter, Kathleen Delea, Denise Cronin, Hannah Dineen, Eithne Duggan, Renee Fitzgerald, Vivienne Harris, Cathy Landers, Pat Lenihan, Josie McGrath, Therése O'Callaghan, Nancy O'Driscoll, Irene O'Keeffe and Betty Sugrue.

Under Camogie's National Development Plan 2010-2015, "Our Game, Our Passion", five new camogie clubs were to be established in the county by 2015.

Clubs 
Glen Rovers (4) Killeagh (1980) and Milford GAA  (2) 2013 and 2014 have won the All Ireland senior club championship.

County teams

The Cork senior camogie team represents Cork in the National Camogie League and the All-Ireland Senior Camogie Championship. There are also intermediate, junior, under-21 and minor teams.

References

External links
Cork Camogie Board

    
Sport in County Cork by sport